Johannes Ludwig Janson (1 September 1849 – 28 October 1914) was a German specialist in veterinary science. He is noted for having introduced western veterinary science to Meiji period Japan in the late 19th century.

Biography
Janson was hired by the Meiji government of Japan as a foreign advisor and arrived in Tokyo in October 1880. He taught at the Veterinary School in Komaba. During his tenure, the school in Komaba was merged into the School of Agriculture of Tokyo Imperial University. Janson's contract was extended several times, and he continued teaching at Komaba 1902. Many of his students went on to occupy important positions within the Japanese government.

Janson wrote a number of scientific papers on the domestic animals and veterinary medicine practices in Japan

Janson married a Japanese woman, and his grave is in Kagoshima, the native place of his wife.

References

1849 births
1914 deaths
German expatriates in Japan
Foreign advisors to the government in Meiji-period Japan
Academic staff of the University of Tokyo
German veterinarians
Foreign educators in Japan